Dimitrios or Dimitris Stamatis (Greek: Δημήτρης Σταμάτης) may mean:
 Dimitrios Stamatis (basketball) (b. 1996), Greek professional basketball player
  (b. 1950), Greek MP for New Democracy and government minister in the Cabinet of Antonis Samaras (2012–15)
  (b. 1952), Greek MP for New Democracy, ANEL and Nea MERA